Libo's gecko (Gekko liboensis) is a species of gecko. It is endemic to Southern China (Guizhou and Guangxi provinces).

References

Gekko
Reptiles described in 1982
Endemic fauna of China
Reptiles of China